Liza del Sierra (also spelled Del Sierra, born 30 August 1985) is a French pornographic actress, film director and producer.

Biography
Del Sierra was born Émilie Delaunay in Pontoise, in the Parisian region. She later grew up mostly in Bordeaux. After working as a stripper, she shot her first pornographic film in 2005, with her husband's approval. They later divorced, they both surrendered.

After making several films in France, she worked for a time in Hungary's porn industry. She also stated in a 2012 interview that she had escorted for some time when she wasn't getting enough film offers.

In 2009, she received a career achievement award at the Brussels International Festival of Eroticism. In 2010, she appeared in one episode of the series Du hard ou du cochon !, the French remake of PG Porn, broadcast on Canal +. After shooting a gonzo in France with Manuel Ferrara, she went to work in the United States, where she received several AVN Awards nominations. On July 11, 2011, Complex ranked her eightieth on their list of "The Top 100 Hottest Porn Stars (Right Now)".
Her American career helped her to achieve more fame in her home country, where she became familiar to the general public in the early 2010s. After returning to France, she started directing and producing. In 2014, the production of one of her films as a director was the subject of a documentary about the porn industry, broadcast on France 2.

Awards and nominations

References

External links

 

1985 births
French emigrants to the United States
French pornographic film actresses
Living people
People from Pontoise
Actresses from Bordeaux
French pornographic film directors
French pornographic film producers
Women pornographic film directors
Women pornographic film producers
French women film directors
French women film producers
Mass media people from Bordeaux